Lokkhi Kakima Superstar is a 2022 Indian Bengali Language Drama television series which is broadcast on Bengali General Entertainment Channel Zee Bangla and is also available on the digital platform ZEE5 even before TV telecast. It stars Aparajita Auddy and Debshankar Haldar in the lead roles. It also stars Sharly Modak and Souvik Banerjee in parallel lead roles. It was premiered on 14 February 2022.

Plot
Lokkhi (Bengali name for Lakshmi) is a vibrant middle-aged woman who runs a little shop, "Lokkhi Bhandar" to support her joint family. This business is her soul which gives her the joy and will to survive. Her trials and tribulations form the crux of the show.

Cast

Main
 Aparajita Auddy as Lokkhi Das (née Roy): owner of 'Lokkhi Bhandar', Debabrata's wife; Debaditya, Debdulal and Riya's mother, Sonali and Hongshini's mother-in-law
 Debshankar Halder as Debabrata Das aka Debu: Lokkhi's husband; Debaditya, Debdulal and Riya's father, Sonali and Hongshini's father-in-law 
 Souvik Banerjee as Debdulal Das aka Dulal/Hiraak: Lokkhi and Debabrata's son, Hongshini's husband
 Sharly Modak as Hongshini Das (née Roychowdhury) aka Chini / Hansh: Lokkhi and Debabrata's daughter-in-law, Debdulal's wife

Recurring
 Ananya Guha as Riya Das: Lokkhi and Debabrata's daughter, Debaditya and Debdulal's younger sister, Dipta's love interest
 Swarnodipto Ghosh as Debaditya Das aka Deba: Lokkhi and Debabrata's elder son, Sonali's husband.
 Arpita Mondal as Sonali Das aka Sona : Debaditya's wife, Lokkhi and Debabrata's elder daughter in law.
 Adhiraj Ganguly as Laltu Das : Subhabrata and Rina's son
 Debosmita Bonik as Tiya Das: Laltu's sister, Subhabrata and Rina's daughter
 Raktim Samanta as Biltu Das: Priyo and Tapasi's son
 Tapasya Dasgupta as Rina Das: Laltu and Keya's mother, Subhabrata's wife
 Sanjoy Basu as Subhabrata Das aka Subho: Laltu and Keya's father, Debabrata's brother, Rina's husband.
 Anirban Ghosh as Priyobrata Das aka Priyo: Tapasi's husband, Biltu's father, Debabrata's younger brother
 Sree Basu as Tapasi Das aka Rupasi: Priyo's wife, Biltu's mother.
 Ananya Sengupta / Nabanita Dutta as Ranjana Mukherjee aka "Binuni": Debabrata's one sided lover, a school teacher.
 Ratna Ghoshal as Parulbala Das: Debabrata, Subhabrata, Priyobrata's mother, Lokkhi's mother in law, Debaditya, Debdulal and Riya's grandmother
 Bharat Kaul as Somshankar Roychowdhury: Hongshini, Abhra and Dipta's father
 Rajiv Bose as Abhra Roychowdhury - Hongshini and Dipta's elder brother; Sonia's husband.
 Rimjhim Mitra as Sonia Roychowdhury: Abhra's wife
 Raunak Dey Bhoumik as Dipta Roychowdhury: Abhra and Hongshini's younger brother, Riya's love interest 
 Koushik Bhattacharya as Biren: Tapasi's brother.
 Sandip Dey as Ardhendu: Lokkhi's rival.
 Indranil Mallick as Ronojoy aka Rono: Hongshini's ex-fiancé interest
 Surajit Pramanik as Ratan: Lokkhi's worker.
 Avery Singha Roy as Kojagori Roy Chowdhury: Hongshini's late mother.
 Krishnakishore Mukherjee as Aloke Sanyal
 Chhanda Chatterjee as Madhubala: Debabrata, Subhabrata, Priyobrata's aunt
 Sargami Rumpa as Arna Roy
 Sarbari Mukherjee as Maya Golder 
 Ranit Modak as Ronty
Gora Dhar as Horipada Maity

Crossover episodes

Reception

TRP Ratings

References

Zee Bangla original programming
Bengali-language television programming in India
2022 Indian television series debuts
Indian drama television series